Jefferson School, also known as East Elementary and Clifton Forge Elementary East, is a historic school building located at Clifton Forge, Alleghany County, Virginia. It was built in 1926, as a rectangular two-story building is clad in running-bond brick in the Colonial Revival style. It sits on a raised concrete foundation and has ribbons of small-paned double-hung windows and a recessed front entrance.

A library and cafeteria were not added until 1937, when improvements also included water fountains, a public address system and projector.  The town high school built for White Americans in 1928 had a cafeteria and libraries were required for schools by 1902.  A two-story rectangular addition was built in 1952. 1952 improvements included more classrooms, an auditorium/gymnasium, an Industrial arts shop and an office for the principle.  Teachers had no offices. The school provided primary and secondary school education for African-Americans attending school in the Clifton Forge community from 1926 until 1965.
It was added to the National Register of Historic Places in 2010.  

The previous building from 1902 is just around the corner from the 1926 school.

References

African-American history of Virginia
School buildings on the National Register of Historic Places in Virginia
Colonial Revival architecture in Virginia
School buildings completed in 1926
Schools in Alleghany County, Virginia
National Register of Historic Places in Alleghany County, Virginia
1926 establishments in Virginia